In statistics, the method of support is a technique that is used to make inferences from datasets.

According to A. W. F. Edwards, the method of support aims to make inferences about unknown parameters in terms of the relative support, or log likelihood, induced by a set of data for a particular parameter value.  The technique may be used whether or not prior information is available.  

The method of maximum likelihood is part of the method of support, but note that the method of support also provides confidence regions that are defined in terms of their support.

Notable proponents of the method of support include A. W. F. Edwards.

Bibliography

Edwards, A.W.F. 1972. Likelihood. Cambridge University Press, Cambridge (expanded edition, 1992, Johns Hopkins University Press, Baltimore). 

Likelihood
Maximum likelihood estimation